Evgeny Damirovich Valiev (born May 3, 1990) is a Russian professional basketball player.

Professional career
On June 25, 2019, he has signed a two-year contract with Khimki of the VTB United League. On December 2, 2019, he has signed a season long loan deal with Parma.

References

External links
 Evgeny Valiev at eurobasket.com
 Evgeny Valiev at euroleague.net

1990 births
Living people
2019 FIBA Basketball World Cup players
BC Khimki players
BC Zenit Saint Petersburg players
Centers (basketball)
Medalists at the 2013 Summer Universiade
Parma Basket players
People from Monchegorsk
Power forwards (basketball)
Russian men's basketball players
Universiade gold medalists for Russia
Universiade medalists in basketball
Sportspeople from Murmansk Oblast